(formerly ) is a Japanese animation studio owned by Nintendo that develops "visual content" using Nintendo properties.

History
The company was founded by Hiroshi Hirokawa on March 18, 2011, in Tokyo, Japan under the name of Dynamo Pictures.

Nintendo announced their intent to acquire Dynamo Pictures and change its name to Nintendo Pictures on July 14, 2022, citing the focus of the company to strengthen the planning and production structure of visual content. The deal closed on October 3, with the company becoming a full subsidiary of Nintendo, as well as adopting its new name. Many fans of the 2006 video game Elite Beat Agents noticed that a mission in the game references a fictional company called Nintendo Pictures.

The company announced that they are currently looking for new employees.

Works 
The company has worked on CG production for Ghost in the Shell: SAC_2045, Kingsglaive: Final Fantasy XV, Garo: Divine Flame, TsukiPro the Animation, and Yuri on Ice. The company has also worked on motion capture for Persona 5, Monster Hunter Stories, and Nier Replicant. It was also involved with anime titles such as Earwig and the Witch, Macross Delta Absolute Live!!!!!!, and the Pikmin short films, CGs in games such as Metroid: Other M and overall work for many different anime, games and products over the years using computer-generated imagery.

Notes

References

External links
 
 Dynamo Pictures


Computer animation studios
Film production companies of Japan
Mass media companies established in 2011
Japanese companies established in 2011
2022 mergers and acquisitions
Mass media companies based in Tokyo
Nintendo divisions and subsidiaries